Industrial artificial intelligence, or industrial AI, usually refers to the application of artificial intelligence to industry. Unlike general artificial intelligence which is a frontier research discipline to build computerized systems that perform tasks requiring human intelligence, industrial AI is more concerned with the application of such technologies to address industrial pain-points for customer value creation, productivity improvement, cost reduction, site optimization, predictive analysis  and insight discovery. Although in a dystopian vision of AI applications, intelligent machines may take away jobs of humans and cause social and ethical issues, industry in general holds a more positive view of AI and sees this transformation of economy unstoppable and expects huge business opportunities in this process.

History 
The concept of artificial intelligence was initially proposed in the 1940s, and the idea of improving productivity and gaining insights through smart analytics and modelling is not new. Artificial Intelligence and Knowledge-Based systems have been an active research branch of artificial intelligence for the entire product life cycle for product design, production planning, distribution, and field services. E-manufacturing systems and e-factories did not use the term “AI,”  but they scale up modeling of engineering systems to enable complete integration of elements in the manufacturing eco-system for smart operation management.

Recently, to accelerate leadership in AI initiative, the US government launched an official website AI.gov to highlight its priorities in the AI space. There are several reasons for the recent popularity of industrial AI: More affordable sensors and the automated process of data acquisition; More powerful computation capability of computers to perform more complex tasks at a faster speed with lower cost; Faster connectivity infrastructure and more accessible cloud services for data management and computing power outsourcing.

Categories 
Technology alone never creates any business value if the problems in industry are not well studied. The major categories which industrial AI may contribute to include; product and service innovation, process improvement, and insight discovery.

Cloud Foundry service platforms widely embed the artificial intelligent technologies. Cybermanufacturing systems also apply predictive analytics and cyber-physical modeling to address the gap between production and machine health for optimized productivity.

Product applications for user value creation 

Industrial AI can be embedded to existing products or services to make them more effective, reliable, safer, and to enhance their longevity. The automotive industry, for example, uses computer vision to avoid accidents and enable vehicles to stay in lane, facilitating safer driving. In manufacturing, one example is the prediction of blade life for self-aware band saw machines, so that users will be able to rely on evidence of degradation rather than experience, which is safer, will extend blade life, and build up blade usage profile to help blade selection.

Process applications for productivity improvement 
Automation is one of the major aspects in process applications of industrial AI. With the help of AI, the scope and pace of automation have been fundamentally changed. AI technologies boost the performance and expand the capability of conventional AI applications. An example is the collaborative robots. Collaborative robotic arms are able to learn the motion and path demonstrated by human operators and perform the same task. AI also automates the process that used to require human participation. An example is the Hong Kong subway, where an AI program decides the distribution and job scheduling of engineers with more efficiency and reliability than human counterparts do.

Another aspect of process applications is the modeling large-scale systems. Cybermanufacturing systems are defined as a manufacturing service system that is networked and resilient to faults by evidence-based modeling and data-driven deep learning. Such a system deals with large and usually geographically distributed assets, which is hard to be modeled via conventional individual-asset physics-based model. With machine learning and optimization algorithms, a bottom-up framework considering machine health can leverage large samples of assets and automate the operation management, spare part inventory planning, and maintenance scheduling process.

Insight applications for knowledge discovery 
Industrial AI can also be used for knowledge discovery by identifying insights in engineering systems. In aviation and aeronautics, AI has been playing a vital role in many critical areas, one of which is safety assurance and root cause. NASA is trying to proactively manage risks to aircraft safety by analyzing flight numeric data and text reports in parallel to not only detect anomalies but also relate it to the causal factors. This mined insight of why certain faults happen in the past will shed light on predictions of similar incidents in the future and prevent problems before they occur.

Predictive and preventive maintenance through data-driven machine learning is also critical in cost reduction for industrial applications. Prognostics and health management (PHM) programs capture the opportunities at the shop floor by modeling equipment health degradation.

Challenges 
The challenges of industrial AI to unlock the value lies in the transformation of raw data to intelligent predictions for rapid decision-making. In general, there are four major challenges in realizing industrial AI: data, speed, fidelity, and interpretability.

Engineering systems now generate a lot of data and modern industry is indeed a big data environment. However, industrial data usually is structured, but may be low-quality.

Production process happens fast and the equipment and work piece can be expensive, the AI applications need to be applied in real-time to be able to detect anomalies immediately to avoid waste and other consequences. Cloud-based solutions can be powerful and fast, but they still would not fit certain computation efficiency requirements. Edge computing may be a better choice in such scenario.

Unlike consumer-faced AI recommendations systems which have a high tolerance for false positives and negatives, even a very low rate of false positives or negatives rate may cost the total credibility of AI systems. Industrial AI applications are usually dealing with critical issues related to safety, reliability, and operations. Any failure in predictions could incur a negative economic and/or safety impact on the users and discourage them to rely on AI systems.

Besides prediction accuracy and performance fidelity, the industrial AI systems must also go beyond prediction results and give root cause analysis for anomalies. This requires that during development, data scientists need to work with domain experts and include domain know-how into the modeling process, and have the model adaptively learn and accumulate such insights as knowledge.

See also
Operational artificial intelligence
Artificial intelligence in heavy industry

References 

Artificial intelligence